Cape Carysfort is a headland in the north east of East Falkland between Macbride Head and Volunteer Point. Lochhead Pond is behind it.  In 1921 it was the site of the shipwreck of SS Guvernøren, a whale oil tanker which, under its former name SS Imo, had been involved in the massive 1917 explosion that caused severe damage to Halifax, Nova Scotia.

The Spanish name for the cape is Cabo Corrientes.

References

Headlands of East Falkland